Jørn Henrik Sværen (born 12 November 1974) is a Norwegian author, publisher, translator and musician. He ran the small press H Press from 2004–2009, and currently runs England Forlag (England Press). He has been a member of the band Ulver since 2000.

In 2011, Kolon Forlag published Dronning av England, a collection of Sværen's texts originally published in journals and catalogues, as well as handmade chapbooks from England Forlag. Queen of England, Sværen's translation of the book into English, was published by Black Square Editions in January 2017. In 2020, Kolon Forlag published a second collection of Sværen's works, Britisk museum (British Museum).  

Sværen was the editor of Den engelske kanal (The English Channel), an annual poetry journal dedicated to Scandinavian poetry and international poetry in translation, published by Kolon Forlag from 2013–2019. In 2020, Sværen started a new publishing project, Gresshoppene har ingen konge (The Locusts Have No King), a magazine printed at irregular intervals in other Scandinavian literary magazines.

Bibliography  
 En kirke (A Church) (Oslo: England Forlag, 2007)
 Et barn eller en bok (A Child or a Book) (Oslo: England Forlag, 2008)
 London (Oslo: England Forlag, 2009)
 Tre bøker (Three books) (Oslo: England Forlag, 2010)
 Dronning av England (Queen of England) (Oslo: Kolon Forlag, 2011)
 Det ferdige verkets skjønnhet (The Beauty of the Finished Work) (Stockholm: Chateaux, 2013)
 Vi er tiggere (We Are Beggars) (Oslo: England Forlag, 2014)
 Håndtak (Handle) (Oslo: England Forlag, 2015)
 Bordkort (Place Cards) (Oslo: England Forlag, 2016)
 Et barn bærer (A Child Carries) (Oslo: England Forlag, 2016)
 Dronningburet (The Queen Cage) (Oslo: England Forlag, 2018)
 Klokkene (The Clocks) (Oslo: England Forlag, 2019)
 Britisk museum (British Museum) (Oslo: Kolon Forlag, 2020)
 To bøker (Two Books) (Oslo: England Forlag, 2021)
 Heraldisk nøkkel (Heraldic Key) (Oslo: England Typografisk Verksted, 2022)

In translation 
 As figuras (The Figures) (trans. Øyunn Rishøi Hedemann and Emilio Araúxo, Santiago de Compostela: Amastra-n-Gallar, 2011)
 Trois livres (Three books) (trans. Jørn H. Sværen, Corbières: à la Pension Victoria, 2011)
 Dronning af England (Queen of England) (trans. Andreas Vermehren Holm, Copenhagen: Forlaget Virkelig, 2013)
 Ord og handling (Words and Deeds) (trans. Andreas Vermehren Holm, Copenhagen: Forlaget Virkelig, 2013)
 La Beauté de l’œuvre finie (The Beauty of the Finished Work) (trans. Jørn. H. Sværen, supplement, L'usage 5, Corbières, 2013)
 Vi er tiggere (We Are Beggars) (trans. Andreas Vermehren Holm, Copenhagen: Forlaget Virkelig, 2015)
 Det færdige værks skønhed (The Beauty of the Finished Work) (trans. Andreas Vermehren Holm, Copenhagen: Forlaget Virkelig, 2016)
 Bordkort (Place Cards) (trans. Andreas Vermehren Holm, Copenhagen: Forlaget Virkelig, 2016)
 Håndtag (Handle) (trans. Andreas Vermehren Holm, Copenhagen: Forlaget Virkelig, 2016)
 Queen of England (trans. Jørn H. Sværen, New York: Black Square Editions, 2017)
 Dronningeburet (The Queen Cage) (trans. Andreas Vermehren Holm, Copenhagen: Forlaget Virkelig, 2018)
 Hvidt og sort (White and Black) (trans. Andreas Vermehren Holm, Copenhagen: Forlaget Virkelig, 2018)
 Fyra väggar (Four Walls) (trans. Jørn H. Sværen, Stockholm: Chateaux, 2019)
 Drottning av England (Queen of England) (trans. Oscar Rossi, Stockholm: Bokförlaget Faethon, 2019)
 Blanc et noir (White and Black) (trans. Emmanuel Reymond, Brussels: Vies Parallèles 2020)
 Reine d'Angleterre (Queen of England) (trans. Emmanuel Reymond, Marseilles: Éric Pesty Éditeur, 2020)
 Britisk museum (British Museum) (trans. Andreas Vermehren Holm, Copenhagen: Rue Lord Byron, 2021 )

Translations 
 Emmanuel Hocquard: En prøve på ensomhet (Oslo: H Press, 2006)
 Claude Royet-Journoud: Omveltningen; Begrepet hindring; Objektene inneholder det uendelige; De udelelige naturer (Oslo: H Press, 2009)
 Emmanuel Hocquard: Lysforhold (Oslo: Forlaget Oktober, 2012)
 Keith Waldrop: Vitruvius' lodd (Oslo: Kolon Forlag, 2013)
 Claude Royet-Journoud: De enkle legemers endelighet (Oslo: Kolon Forlag, 2018)
 Andreas Vermehren Holm: Alle tegn i samme natt (Moss: H//O//F, 2018)
 Mei-mei Berssenbrugge: Hallo, rosene (Oslo: Kolon Forlag, 2019)
 Claude Royet-Journoud: Preposisjonenes teori (Oslo: Kolon Forlag, 2021)
 Andreas Vermehren Holm: Metanoia-trilogien (Moss: H//O//F, 2022)
 Claude Royet-Journoud: Hjertets attributter og bruk (Oslo: Kolon Forlag, 2022)

Journals 
 Mazdak Shafieian and Jørn H. Sværen (eds.): Teologi (Oslo: Sola scriptura, 2012)
 Jørn H. Sværen (ed.): Den engelske kanal (Oslo: Kolon Forlag, 2013)
 Jørn H. Sværen (ed.): Den engelske kanal (Oslo: Kolon Forlag, 2014)
 Jørn H. Sværen (ed.): Den engelske kanal (Oslo: Kolon Forlag, 2015)
 Jørn H. Sværen (ed.): Den engelske kanal (Oslo: Kolon Forlag, 2016)
 Jørn H. Sværen (ed.): Den engelske kanal (Oslo: Kolon Forlag, 2017)
 Jørn H. Sværen (ed.): Den engelske kanal (Oslo: Kolon Forlag, 2018)
 Jørn H. Sværen (ed.): Den engelske kanal (Oslo: Kolon Forlag, 2019)
 Jørn H. Sværen (ed.): Gresshoppene har ingen konge (2020–)

Discography 

 Silence Teaches You How to Sing (2001)
 Silencing the singing (2001)
 Lyckantropen Themes (2002)
 A Quick Fix of Melancholy (2003) 
 Svidd neger (2003)
 Blood Inside (2005)
 Shadows of the Sun (2007)
 Wars of the Roses (2011)
 The Norwegian National Opera (2011)
 Childhood's End (2012)
 Messe I.X-VI.X (2013)
 Terrestrials (2014)
 ATGCLVLSSCAP (2016)
 Riverhead (2016)
 The Assassination of Julius Caesar (2017)
 Sic Transit Gloria Mundi (2017)
 Drone Activity (2019)
 Flowers of Evil (2020)

External links 
 England Forlag
 H Press
 Ulver Official Homepage

References

1974 births
Living people
People from Drammen
20th-century Norwegian poets
21st-century Norwegian poets
Norwegian male poets
Norwegian musicians
20th-century Norwegian musicians
21st-century Norwegian musicians
20th-century Norwegian male writers
21st-century Norwegian male writers
Ulver members